Asia Airfreight Terminal (AAT) is an air cargo terminal based at the Hong Kong International Airport in Chek Lap Kok, New Territories, Hong Kong.

AAT has two terminals, Terminal 1 and Terminal 2. AAT provides a handling capacity of 1.5 million tons per annum and is one of the world's leading air cargo terminal operators. It is the second largest cargo handler in Hong Kong by cargo handling volume, after HACTL's SuperTerminal 1.

Shareholders 
AAT is a consortium comprising five shareholders.
SATS Ltd
Eastern Option Limited (A subsidiary of China Merchants Holdings (International))
Torres Investments (A subsidiary of Kerry Properties)
Keppel Telecommunications & Transportation
Federal Express

References

External links 
Asia Airfreight Terminal

FedEx
Transport companies established in 1998
Chek Lap Kok
Logistics companies of China
Singapore Airlines
China Merchants
Kerry Properties
Air cargo terminals
1998 establishments in Hong Kong